The Rime of the Ancient Mariner (originally The Rime of the Ancyent Marinere) is the longest major poem by the English poet Samuel Taylor Coleridge, written in 1797–1798 and published in 1798 in the first edition of Lyrical Ballads. Some modern editions use a revised version printed in 1817 that featured a gloss. Along with other poems in Lyrical Ballads, it is often considered a signal shift to modern poetry and the beginning of British Romantic literature.

The Rime of the Ancient Mariner recounts the experiences of a sailor who has returned from a long sea voyage. The mariner stops a man who is on his way to a wedding ceremony and begins to narrate a story. The Wedding-Guest’s reaction turns from bemusement to impatience to fear to fascination as the mariner's story progresses, as can be seen in the language style: Coleridge uses narrative techniques such as personification and repetition to create a sense of danger, the supernatural, or serenity, depending on the mood in different parts of the poem.

Synopsis 

The poem begins with an old grey-bearded sailor, the Mariner, stopping a guest at a wedding ceremony to tell him a story of a sailing voyage he took long ago. The Wedding-Guest is at first reluctant to listen, as the ceremony is about to begin, but the mariner's glittering eye captivates him.

The mariner's tale begins with his ship departing on its journey. Despite initial good fortune, the ship is driven south by a storm and eventually reaches the icy waters of the Antarctic. An albatross appears and leads the ship out of the ice jam where it is stuck, but even as the albatross is fed and praised by the ship's crew, the mariner shoots the bird:

The crew is angry with the mariner, believing the albatross brought the south wind that led them out of the Antarctic. However, the sailors change their minds when the weather becomes warmer and the mist disappears:

They soon find that they made a grave mistake in supporting this crime, as it arouses the wrath of spirits who then pursue the ship "from the land of mist and snow"; the south wind that had initially blown them north now sends the ship into uncharted waters near the equator, where it is becalmed:

The sailors change their minds again and blame the mariner for the torment of their thirst. In anger, the crew forces the mariner to wear the dead albatross about his neck, perhaps to illustrate the burden he must suffer from killing it, or perhaps as a sign of regret:

After a "weary time", the ship encounters a ghostly hulk. On board are Death (a skeleton) and the "Night-mare Life-in-Death", a deathly pale woman, who are playing dice for the souls of the crew. With a roll of the dice, Death wins the lives of the crew members and Life-in-Death the life of the mariner, a prize she considers more valuable. Her name is a clue to the mariner's fate: he will endure a fate worse than death as punishment for his killing of the albatross. One by one, all of the crew members die, but the mariner lives on, seeing for seven days and nights the curse in the eyes of the crew's corpses, whose last expressions remain upon their faces:

Eventually, this stage of the mariner's curse is lifted after he begins to appreciate the many sea creatures swimming in the water. Despite his cursing them as "slimy things" earlier in the poem, he suddenly sees their true beauty and blesses them ("A spring of love gush'd from my heart, And I bless'd them unaware"). As he manages to pray, the albatross falls from his neck and his guilt is partially expiated. It then starts to rain, and the bodies of the crew, possessed by good spirits, rise again and help steer the ship. In a trance, the mariner hears two spirits discussing his voyage and penance, and learns that the ship is being powered supernaturally:

Finally the mariner wakes from his trance and comes in sight of his homeland, but is initially uncertain as to whether or not he is hallucinating:

The rotten remains of the ship sink in a whirlpool, leaving only the mariner behind. A hermit on the mainland who has spotted the approaching ship comes to meet it in a boat, rowed by a pilot and his boy. When they pull the mariner from the water, they think he is dead, but when he opens his mouth, the pilot shrieks with fright. The hermit prays, and the mariner picks up the oars to row. The pilot's boy laughs, thinking the mariner is the devil, and cries, "The Devil knows how to row". Back on land, the mariner is compelled by "a woful agony" to tell the hermit his story.

As penance for shooting the albatross, the mariner, driven by the agony of his guilt, is now forced to wander the earth, telling his story over and over, and teaching a lesson to those he meets:

After finishing his story, the mariner leaves, and the wedding-guest returns home, waking the next morning "a sadder and a wiser man".

The poem received mixed reviews from critics, and Coleridge was once told by the publisher that most of the book's sales were to sailors who thought it was a naval songbook. Coleridge made several modifications to the poem over the years. In the second edition of Lyrical Ballads, published in 1800, he replaced many of the archaic words.

Inspiration for the poem

The poem may have been inspired by James Cook's second voyage of exploration (1772–1775) of the South Seas and the Pacific Ocean; Coleridge's tutor, William Wales, was the astronomer on Cook's flagship and had a strong relationship with Cook. On this second voyage Cook crossed three times into the Antarctic Circle to determine whether the fabled great southern continent Terra Australis existed. Critics have also suggested that the poem may have been inspired by the voyage of Thomas James into the Arctic.

According to Wordsworth, the poem was inspired while Coleridge, Wordsworth, and Wordsworth's sister Dorothy were on a walking tour through the Quantock Hills in Somerset. The discussion had turned to a book that Wordsworth was reading, that described a privateering voyage in 1719 during which a melancholy sailor, Simon Hatley, shot a black albatross.

As they discussed Shelvocke's book, Wordsworth proffered the following developmental critique to Coleridge, which importantly contains a reference to tutelary spirits: "Suppose you represent him as having killed one of these birds on entering the south sea, and the tutelary spirits of these regions take upon them to avenge the crime." By the time the trio finished their walk, the poem had taken shape.

Bernard Martin argues in The Ancient Mariner and the Authentic Narrative that Coleridge was also influenced by the life of Anglican clergyman John Newton, who had a near-death experience aboard a slave ship.

The poem may also have been inspired by the legends of the Wandering Jew, who was forced to wander the earth until Judgement Day for a terrible crime, found in Charles Maturin's Melmoth the Wanderer, M. G. Lewis' The Monk (a 1796 novel Coleridge reviewed), and the legend of the Flying Dutchman.

It is argued that the harbour at Watchet in Somerset was the primary inspiration for the poem, although some time before, John Cruikshank, a local acquaintance of Coleridge's, had related a dream about a skeleton ship crewed by spectral sailors. In September 2003, a commemorative statue, by Alan B. Herriot of Penicuik, Scotland, was unveiled at Watchet harbour.

Coleridge's comments
In Biographia Literaria, Coleridge wrote:

In Table Talk, Coleridge wrote:

Wordsworth's comments
Wordsworth wrote to Joseph Cottle in 1799:

However, when Lyrical Ballads was reprinted, Wordsworth included it despite Coleridge's objections, writing:

Early criticisms 

Upon its release, the poem was criticized for being obscure and difficult to read. The use of archaic spelling of words was seen as not in keeping with Wordsworth's claims of using common language. Criticism was renewed again in 1815–1816, when Coleridge added marginal notes to the poem that were also written in an archaic style. These notes or glosses, placed next to the text of the poem, ostensibly interpret the verses much like marginal notes found in the Bible. There were many opinions on why Coleridge inserted the gloss. Charles Lamb, who had deeply admired the original for its attention to "Human Feeling", claimed that the gloss distanced the audience from the narrative, weakening the poem's effects. The entire poem was first published in the collection of Lyrical Ballads. Another version of the poem was published in the 1817 collection entitled Sibylline Leaves (see 1817 in poetry).

Interpretations
On a surface level the poem explores a violation of nature and the resulting psychological effects on the mariner and on all those who hear him. According to Jerome McGann the poem is like a salvation story. The poem's structure is multi-layered text based on Coleridge's interest in higher criticism. "Like the Iliad or Paradise Lost or any great historical product, the Rime is a work of trans-historical rather than so-called universal significance. This verbal distinction is important because it calls attention to a real one. Like The Divine Comedy or any other poem, the Rime is not valued or used always or everywhere or by everyone in the same way or for the same reasons."

Whalley (1947) suggests that the Ancient Mariner is an autobiographical portrait of Coleridge himself, comparing the mariner's loneliness with Coleridge's own feelings of loneliness expressed in his letters and journals.

In Sexual Personae: Art and Decadence from Nefertiti to Emily Dickinson (1990), Camille Paglia writes that the Bridegroom, Wedding-Guest and Mariner all represent aspects of Coleridge: "The Bridegroom is a masculine persona" that is "integrated with society", and that the Wedding-Guest is an adolescent seeking "sexual fulfilment and collective joy", that must merge with the Bridegroom but is unable to because of the appearance of a spectre-self, a "male heroine" who "luxuriates in passive suffering".

Versions of the poem
Coleridge often made changes to his poems and The Rime of the Ancient Mariner was no exception – he produced at least eighteen different versions over the years. He regarded revision as an essential part of creating poetry. The first published version of the poem was in Lyrical Ballads in 1798. The second edition of this anthology in 1800 included a revised text, requested by Coleridge, in which some of the language and many of the archaic spellings were modernised. He also reduced the title to The Ancient Mariner but for later versions the longer title was restored. The 1802 and 1805 editions of Lyrical Ballads had minor textual changes. In 1817 Coleridge's Sibylline Leaves anthology included a new version with an extensive marginal gloss, written by the poet. The last version he produced was in 1834.

Traditionally literary critics regarded each revision of a text by an author as producing a more authoritative version and Coleridge published somewhat revised versions of the poem in his Poetical Works anthology editions of 1828, 1829, and lastly in 1834—the year of his death. More recently scholars look to the earliest version, even in manuscript, as the most authoritative but for this poem no manuscript is extant. Hence the editors of the edition of Collected Poems published in 1972 used the 1798 version but made their own modernisation of the spelling and they added some passages taken from later editions.

The 1817 edition, the one most used today and the first to be published under Coleridge's own name rather than anonymously, added a new Latin epigraph but the major change was the addition of the gloss that has a considerable effect on the way the poem reads. Coleridge's grandson E.H. Coleridge produced a detailed study of the published versions of the poem. Over all, Coleridge's revisions resulted in the poem losing thirty-nine lines and an introductory prose "Argument", and gaining fifty-eight glosses and a Latin epigraph.

In general the anthologies included printed lists of errata and, in the case of the particularly lengthy list in Sibylline Leaves, the list was included at the beginning of the volume. Such changes were often editorial rather than merely correcting errors. Coleridge also made handwritten changes in printed volumes of his work, particularly when he presented them as gifts to friends.

In popular culture

In addition to being referred to in several other notable works, due to the popularity of the poem the phrase "albatross around one's neck" has become an English-language idiom referring to "a heavy burden of guilt that becomes an obstacle to success".

The phrase "Water, water, every where, / Nor any drop to drink" has appeared widely in popular culture, but usually given in a more natural modern phrasing as "Water, water, everywhere / But not a drop to drink"; some such appearances have, in turn, played on the frequency with which these lines are misquoted.

See also
 Albatross (metaphor)

Notes

References

Sources

External links

Illustrations from The Rime of the Ancient Mariner, Gustave Doré illustrations from the University at Buffalo Libraries’ Rare & Special Books collection
The Rime of the Ancient Mariner, text from Project Gutenberg
The Rime of the Ancient Mariner, audiobook (Jane Aker) from Project Gutenberg
The Rime of the Ancient Mariner: Critical Analysis and Summary
 
Abstracts of literary criticism of The Rime of the Ancient Mariner

Poetry by Samuel Taylor Coleridge
British poems
Maritime folklore
1798 poems
Antarctica in fiction
Narrative poems
Birds in popular culture
Poems adapted into films
Nautical fiction